Ali Niyaf is the First Maldivian Neurosurgeon of the Maldives. He is serving as the President of the Maldivian Medical Association since 2019. He was instrumental in building the First Neurosurgery establishment in the Maldives at the ADK Hospital. Niyaf conducted the first successful live surgery in the Maldives.

Brain and Spine Conference
Niyaf initiated the Neurosurgery conference series Brain & Spine in the in 2017, which is attended by neurosurgeons from the United States, Germany, Philippines and Nepal.

Authorship
Dr. Ali Niyaf has co-authored Neurosurgery publications in Management of adhesive intestinal obstruction, Giant Brain Abscess in a Neonate Managed with External Drainage, Comparative Analysis of Efficacy of Endoscopic versus Open Carpal Tunnel Release.

References

Living people
People from Malé
Maldivian surgeons
1980 births